Abdi-Ashirta (Akkadian: 𒀵𒀀𒅆𒅕𒋫 Warad-Ašîrta [ARAD2-A-ši-ir-ta]; fl. 14th century BC) was the ruler of Amurru who was in conflict with King Rib-Hadda of Byblos.

While some contend that Amurru was a new kingdom in southern Syria subject to nominal Egyptian control, new research suggests that during Abdi-Ashirta's lifetime, Amurru was a "decentralized land" that consisted of several independent polities. Consequently, though Abdi-Ashirta had influence among these polities, he did not directly rule them. Rib-Hadda complained bitterly to Pharaoh Akhenaten — in the Amarna letters (EA) — of Abdi-Ashirta's attempts to alter the political landscape at the former's expense. Abdi-Ashirta's death is mentioned in EA 101 by Rib-Hadda in a letter to Akhenaten. Unfortunately for Rib-Hadda, Abdi-Ashirta was succeeded by his equally capable son Aziru, who would later capture, exile and likely kill Rib-Hadda. Aziru subsequently defected to the Hittites, which caused Egypt to lose control over her northern border province of Amurru which Aziru controlled.

References

Year of birth unknown
Year of death unknown
Amarna letters writers
Canaanite people
14th-century BC rulers
14th-century BC Near Eastern people